Pantry Panic is the third animated cartoon short in the Woody Woodpecker series. Released theatrically on November 24, 1941, the film was produced by Walter Lantz Productions and distributed by Universal Pictures. This is the only cartoon of when Woody doesn't say "Guess Who?" in the opening titles, although his trademark laugh in the cartoon itself is still present.

Plot 

Woody stays behind to swim while the other birds in the forest migrate south for the winter. Just after the other birds leave, the cold of winter sets in instantly, to the point that Woody's swimming hole freezes solid after he jumps in. Woody does not worry, because he has stored up plenty of food. However, a snow storm enters his house and makes off with all of his possessions, food included.

Two weeks later, Woody is delusional and literally staring starvation, personified as something vaguely resembling the Grim Reaper, in the face. A month later, a hungry cat happens upon Woody's cabin (aware of the viewers reading one of the title cards and its description of said "hungry little kitty cat"), and conspires to eat the woodpecker. The famished Woody, however, plans just as quickly to eat the cat, and the two duel. Eventually, a moose appears at Woody's open door, and the starving cat and woodpecker chase after it to capture and eat it. Afterwards, however, the meal proves not to be enough to satisfy both Woody and the cat, who instantly resume their game of trying to eat each other.

Voice cast 
 Danny Webb as Woody Woodpecker, Korny Kat, and Moose
 Mel Blanc as Woody Woodpecker (some lines)
 Margaret McKay as Birds
 Marjorie Tarlton as Birds
 Kent Rogers as Woody Woodpecker (one line), Birds

Production notes 
Like most of early 1940s Lantz cartoons, Pantry Panic carried no director's credit. Lantz himself has claimed to have directed this cartoon.

Pantry Panic was the third cartoon in the Woody Woodpecker series, featuring an early, garish Woody Woodpecker design. It was the only short with Danny Webb as Woody's voice, and also the last short to feature Mel Blanc since Blanc had recorded Woody's earliest dialogue before he got an exclusive contract to do voice work for cartoons solely for Leon Schlesinger Productions. However, Blanc's recording of the woodpecker's trademark laugh would continue to be recycled until 1951, when Grace Stafford rerecorded a softer version, while Woody's "Guess Who?", also provided by Blanc, would continue to be used in the opening titles until the end of the series in 1972.

Pantry Panic was reworked in 1946 as Who's Cookin' Who?. The starvation personification would also reappear in the remake as well as 1951's The Redwood Sap. As of 2021, this entry is the only Woody Woodpecker cartoon in the public domain. As such, it is freely distributed, and can be downloaded from the Internet Archive and seen on YouTube.

References

External links 

 Watch Pantry Panic in fully restored HD on YouTube
 
 

1941 short films
1941 comedy films
Films directed by Walter Lantz
Walter Lantz Productions shorts
Woody Woodpecker films
1940s American animated films
Articles containing video clips
Universal Pictures short films
Universal Pictures animated short films
Animated films about animals
Animated films about birds
1941 animated films
American comedy short films
1940s English-language films
American animated short films
Self-reflexive films